Go! Sudoku is a sudoku puzzle game for the PlayStation Portable, released in Europe on December 2, 2005 and North America on March 21, 2006. It was later released in Japan on April 27, 2006 under the name of Kazuo (カズオ), as Nikoli holds the trademark for Sudoku. The game was mildly received by gamers and professional critics.

Features
The base game features 1000 Sudoku puzzles grouped by difficulty, as well as various modes, customizable grids and multiplayer. 200 more puzzles are available for download from the Go! Sudoku official website, and players can add their own custom backgrounds to the games.

Bugs
Many players as well as professional reviewers have reported a major glitch in the PSP title, in which a mysterious message dialog pops up at semi-regular intervals throughout the game. The dialog box covers the entire playing board and interrupts the gameplay by preventing players from seeing the board or making changes to it. The dialog box is titled "Attention!" and only contains the words "Please wait..." There is no way to close the dialog box, though it will vanish on its own usually after about 15 seconds.

The problem is exacerbated due to Go! Sudoku being a single-player game that is played against the clock. Since the object of the game is to complete each puzzle in as little time as possible, with points being awarded based on how quickly the player finishes, the frequent appearance of the message dialog hinders any attempts at beating one's previous high scores, largely negating the competitive element of the single-player gameplay. The bug is even more obtrusive during multiplayer competitive play as it conveys a significant advantage to the player who does not encounter the bug. Additionally, the frequency of the dialog box popping up appears to increase with time, forcing users to eventually exit out of the game completely and restart.

The nature and severity of the bug is considered game-breaking by many. And, though many users have notified Ubisoft about the bug, no official acknowledgment of the problem has been made, nor have any solutions been offered by the publisher as of January 2010. However, there are reports that keeping the PSP fully charged and playing the game with the charger plugged in minimizes the bug's occurrence.

PlayStation 3 edition
Go! Sudoku was also released on the PlayStation Network (for the PlayStation 3 as an initial Starter Pack with 12 puzzles, with a level pack of more than 1200 puzzles.

References

External links
Official Site (North America)
Official "Kazuo" Site (Japanese)

2005 video games
PlayStation 3 games
PlayStation Portable games
PlayStation Network games
Sony Interactive Entertainment games
Ubisoft games
Video games scored by Alastair Lindsay
Video games scored by Allister Brimble
Video games scored by Kenneth Young
Video games developed in the United Kingdom
Sumo Digital games
Sudoku video games